The Sahrawi Red Crescent Society is not a part of the International Red Cross and Red Crescent Movement. But, it is/was active in Western Sahara.

Foundation
The Sahrawi Red Crescent was formed by Sahrawi citizens on November 26, 1975, days after the joint Moroccan-Mauritanian invasion of former Spanish Sahara territory.

Mission
During the first years of the organization, its major task was to reunite families who were scattered through the desert due to the Western Sahara War removing them from the battlefields to the neighbouring Algerian Sahara, facing the aerial bombardments of the Moroccan Air Force. Later came the organization of the refugee camps at the Algerian desert.

References

Red Cross and Red Crescent national societies
Organizations established in 1975
Society of the Sahrawi Arab Democratic Republic
1975 establishments in Spanish Sahara
Medical and health organisations based in the Sahrawi Arab Democratic Republic